Monsey is a hamlet and census-designated place in the town of Ramapo, Rockland County, New York, United States, located north of Airmont, east of Viola, south of New Hempstead, and west of Spring Valley. The village of Kaser is surrounded by the hamlet of Monsey. The 2020 census listed the population at 26,954.

The hamlet has a large, and growing, community of Orthodox Jews.

History
Rockland County was inhabited by the Munsee band of Lenape Native Americans, who were speakers of the Algonquian languages. Monsey Glen, a Native American encampment, is located west of the intersection of State Route 59 and State Route 306. Numerous artifacts have been found there and some rock shelters are still visible.  The Monsey railroad station, which received its name from an alternate spelling of the Munsee Lenape, was built when the New York & Erie Railroad passed through the glen in 1841.

In the 1950s, Monsey was a one stoplight town with a single yeshiva. By 1997, Monsey had 112 synagogues and 45 yeshivas.

Located in Monsey is the Houser-Conklin House, listed on the National Register of Historic Places in 2010.

On December 28, 2019 it was the site of a mass stabbing in the home of a Hasidic rabbi who was hosting a Hanukkah party, leaving five injured and one dead.

Geography

According to the United States Census Bureau, the CDP has a total area of 2.2 square miles (5.8 km2), of which 2.2 square miles (5.7 km2) is land and 0.04 square mile (0.1 km2) (0.90%) is water.

Demographics

As of the census of 2017, there were 22,043 people, 3,984 households, and 2,596 families residing in the CDP. The population density was 6,554.3 per square mile (2,533.9/km2). There were 4,244 housing units at an average density of 1,400.0/sq mi (541.2/km2). The racial makeup of the CDP was 95.8% White, 3.0% African American, 0.03% Native American, 1.05% Asian, 0.01% Pacific Islander, 0.70% from other races, and 1.08% from two or more races. Hispanic or Latino people of any race were 2.86% of the population. 43.98% speak English at home, 41.48% Yiddish, 6.88% Hebrew, 2.69% French or a French creole, 1.85% Spanish, and 1.24% Russian.

There were 2,981 households, out of which 58.9% had children under the age of 18 living with them, 78.0% were married couples living together, 6.0% had a female householder with no husband present, and 12.9% were non-families. 10.6% of all households were made up of individuals, and 4.4% had someone living alone who was 65 years of age or older. The average household size was 4.74 and the average family size was 5.16. In the CDP, the population was spread out, with 48.6% under the age of 18, 10.5% from 18 to 24, 18.2% from 25 to 44, 16.3% from 45 to 64, and 6.4% who were 65 years of age or older. The median age was 19 years. For every 100 females, there were 106.8 males. For every 100 females age 18 and over, there were 106.6 males. The median income for a household in the CDP was $45,194, and the median income for a family was $45,911. Males had a median income of $41,606 versus $33,576 for females. The per capita income for the CDP was $14,000. About 25.4% of families and 30.6% of the population were below the poverty line, including 37.8% of those under age 18 and 9.2% of those age 65 or over.

Jewish community 
Monsey is a major center of Orthodox Judaism in the United States, along with several other cities such as Kiryas Joel, Kaser, Spring Valley, and New Square. It is the largest center of Hasidic Judaism in the United States outside of New York City, with approximately 5,400 households (4.2% of the world's Hasidic population). The migration to Monsey began in the late 1940s when New York City's Orthodox Jews were seeking affordable real estate for their quickly growing communities. These spaces offered the possibility of moving en masse and establishing enclaves where they could lead lives based on halakha (Jewish religious law) without coming into regular conflict with their non-Orthodox neighbors. This represented a major, distinct suburban demographic shift for these communities. Major Hasidic sects represented in Monsey include Satmar, Vizhnitz Monsey, and Belz, with the Rebbes of Berditchev, Lizensk, Lizensk (Rokeah), Nikolsburg, Sambor Yerushalayim-Monsey, Sassov, Shinave, Spinka Monsey, Stanislov, and Vizhnitz Monsey sects being resident in the community. Vizhnitz maintains a cemetery in Monsey.

On December 28, 2019, Monsey was the site of a mass stabbing in the home of a Hasidic rebbe of the Koson sect who was hosting a Hanukkah party, leaving four injured and one fatality.

Notable people

 Shalom Auslander (born 1970), author of Foreskin's Lament, which covers his time growing up in Monsey
 Julia Haart (born 1971), fashion designer and entrepreneur 
 Steven Hill (died 2016), actor, Mission: Impossible, Law & Order
 Yosef Mizrachi (born 1968), kiruv rabbi
Michael Rogers, publisher, journalist, fundraiser, activist
 Mordechai Shapiro (born 1990), singer
 Tovia Singer (born 1960), counter-missionary radio host, author and speaker
 Leib Tropper (born 1950), sexual predator and founding rabbi of the Kol Yaakov Torah Center
 Andrew Carpenter Wheeler (1835–1903), prominent theatrical reviewer, editor, author

Places of interest
 Houser-Conklin House, a historic structure dating to 1775
 Monsey Church (currently New Hope Christian Church), built in 1824
 Ohr Somayach, a men's college of Judaic studies

See also
 New Square, New York − an all-Hasidic village in the same county
 Lakewood Township, New Jersey – a majority Orthodox Jewish township

References

Further reading

External links

 Monsey Fire Department

 
Census-designated places in New York (state)
Census-designated places in Rockland County, New York
Hamlets in New York (state)
Hamlets in Rockland County, New York
Orthodox Jewish communities
Orthodox Judaism in New York (state)